FTY may refer to:
 Fulton County Airport (Georgia), United States
 5-trifluoromethyl-2,4(1H,3H)-pyrimidinedione, the main metabolite of the pharmaceutical drug trifluridine